Hermann Haller may refer to:

Hermann Haller (film editor) (1909–1985)
Hermann Haller (sculptor) (1880–1950)
Hermann Haller (composer) (1914–2002)
Hermann Haller (biologist)